La Trois is a Belgian national television channel, owned and operated by the French-language public-service broadcasting organization RTBF. It was launched on 30 November 2007 and currently distributed via digital terrestrial television, satellite, cable, and IPTV.

La Trois timeshares with Ouftivi, a children block, between 6am to 8pm.

Analogue transmission
For a few years La Trois was broadcast from the Tournai transmitter on channel 60 in the UHF PAL system; however, this was phased out with the implementation of digitalization.

Programming
After its launch and prior to its major revamp in September 2010, its programming consists of reruns and live simulcasts coming from its main channels, La Une & La Deux and also original programming produced for this channel. It also broadcast movies, cultural programming and even documentaries during prime time.

La Trois's programming was identical to that of the now defunct channel, RTBF Sat: live simulcasts and only reruns of programs produced by the RTBF, but continues the same programming as what was on RTBF Sat except sports.

Since September 2010, when RTBF Sat ceased transmission on February 15, 2010, La Trois produces its own programming and became a public-service channel where they do not broadcast advertising, as RTBF Sat and unlike the first 2 channels, La Une and La Deux. La Trois also broadcasts children's programmes, movies and series in the original language with French subtitles, documentaries, archives, JT with sign language and reruns.

A transition program took place between 15 February 2010 and 25 September 2010, when La Trois had its own programming. "This programming consists mainly of youth and some of cultural programming," said François Tron in an interview on the 13:00 edition of Journal Télévisé on La Une on August 23, 2010. Among children's programming, a newscast is specifically produced for children, Niouzz (similar to that of the British newscast produced by the BBC, Newsround).

Currently, La Trois's programming consists of children's & youth programming – branded OufTivi – during the day and during prime-time, it simulcasts the main news bulletin, JT 19h30 with La Une in sign language and later rebroadcast the news without sign language at 20:30, an hour after its live bulletin and also broadcasts cultural programming, documentaries and reruns. La Trois is also considered to be the equivalent to its Flemish counterparts, the 2 sub-channels, Ketnet (children's programming) and Op 12 (cultural and youth programming).

External links 
 Official site of La Trois 

2007 establishments in Belgium
French-language television stations in Belgium
Television channels and stations established in 2007
Television channels in Belgium